Murdo Macfarlane (15 February 1901—7 November 1982) known as Bàrd Mhealboist ("the Melbost Bard") was a published poet, songwriter and campaigner for Scottish Gaelic, especially during the 1970s, when the Ceartas movement was gaining strength.

Life
Born and brought up in Melbost, Isle of Lewis, he was taught Latin, English and French but received no education in Gaelic, his mother tongue. He spent some time working for Lord Leverhulme on various schemes but eventually left to travel to North America in the 1920s and spent many years in Manitoba but did not like the place. In 1932 he returned to Scotland and went on to national service in World War II during the years 1942–1945. Following the end of the war he spent the rest of his life in Lewis and never married. He was also a strong campaigner against the enlargement of Stornoway Airport into a NATO base in the 1970s. He is the subject of a BBC documentary 'Murchadh MacPharlain; Bard Mhealaboist' which won the Celtic Film and Television Festival Award for best Arts documentary in 2001.

Works

In the 1970s, with the Gaelic Resurgence, Murchadh wrote many poems, songs and pipe tunes for the cause, such as Cànan nan Gàidheal, Òran Cogaidh, Màl na Mara, and Mi le m' Uillin air Mo Ghlùin. Allan MacDonald, in his pipe book A' Cheud Ceud, refers to Murchadh as the Crann Tara of the Gaelic Movement.

His poetry was taken up by a young band Na h-Òganaich in the 1970s. This exposure led to bands such as Runrig and Capercaillie being inspired by his work.

In 1974, Macfarlane wrote the song "Cànan nan Gàidheal"  ("Language of the Gaels") which criticized the tendency of Gaels to switch to English. The song has been recorded by Dick Gaughan, Catherine-Ann MacPhee, Karen Matheson, Tannas, Dan ar Braz and Tide Lines. An Irish-language version, Teangaidh or Teanga na nGael, has been recorded by the Irish group Cór Thaobh a' Leithid. and by the singer/songwriter Gráinne Holland. An instrumental version was recorded by Scottish fiddler Duncan Chisholm.

References

External links
BBC Bio - Làrach nam Bàrd (Biography in Scottish Gaelic)
Murchadh MacPhàrlain BBC Alba documentary (Gaelic with English subtitles) 
Photograph
'The Lewis Folk' - Radio documentary from 1976 by Kieran Sheedy of Irish Radio Station RTÉ 1, featuring an interview and song from Murchadh.

1901 births
1982 deaths
People from the Isle of Lewis
20th-century Scottish Gaelic poets
20th-century Scottish poets
Scottish male poets
Scottish Gaelic music
20th-century British male writers